Joseph Watson Black (1909-1988) was a Scottish international lawn bowler.

Bowls career
He won two silver medals in the singles and fours at the 1962 British Empire and Commonwealth Games in Perth with Thomas Hamill, William Moore and Michael Purdon.

He holds the Scottish National Men's Singles Championship record equally with Robert Sprot, David Dall and Darren Burnett, with three titles which he won in 1958, 1959 and 1962.

Trade
He was a miner by trade being the pit deputy at the Fauld Hill Pit in Dumfries and Galloway.

References

1900s births
1988 deaths
Scottish male bowls players
Commonwealth Games silver medallists for Scotland
Bowls players at the 1962 British Empire and Commonwealth Games
Commonwealth Games medallists in lawn bowls
Medallists at the 1962 British Empire and Commonwealth Games